"Beggin" is a song composed by Bob Gaudio and Peggy Farina and first released as a single by American band the Four Seasons in 1967. Initially charting at number 16 in the US, the song became popular in the Northern soul scene in the United Kingdom in the 1970s. It has been covered multiple times, with versions by Norwegian hip-hop duo Madcon and Italian rock band Måneskin topping music charts in Europe and beyond. The Four Seasons' version was remixed in 2007 by French DJ Pilooski and re-released as a single, reaching number 32 in the UK and commercially outperforming the Four Seasons' original release there.

Original version
Keyboardist-songwriter Bob Gaudio had not written a Four Seasons single since 1965's "Girl Come Running", although he had written or co-written almost every Four Seasons hit up to then.

"Beggin, the second single from the Four Seasons' New Gold Hits album in 1967, marked Gaudio's "return" as the Seasons' songwriter, with a combination of Frankie Valli's impassioned soul singing and the band's more contemporary instrumentation. It was also the first Seasons single since "Dawn (Go Away)" on which Gaudio collaborated with a lyricist other than producer Bob Crewe, as lyrics were contributed by Peggy Farina (better known as Peggy Santiglia of the Angels, who sang lead on the 1963 hit "My Boyfriend's Back" and was frequently used as a background singer by Crewe).

The song, backed with "Dody" as a B-side, reached number 16 on the US Billboard Hot 100, continuing the group's string of Billboard top-20 hits. However, it was overshadowed by Valli's "solo" recording of "Can't Take My Eyes Off You", a Gaudio-Crewe composition, which rose to number two. It was the last Gaudio composition for the Four Seasons to chart in the top 20 until 1975's "Who Loves You".

The song is included in Act Two of the Broadway musical about the Four Seasons, Jersey Boys. It was used as the main theme of an ad campaign for Adidas, celebrating the company's 60th anniversary.

Retrospectively, the song has been highly regarded by music critics as a strong example of the Four Seasons' vocal and arrangement abilities. Donald A. Guarisco, writing for AllMusic, described the song as "one of their finest entries" in the genre of the soul ballad, and also commended the song's "funky groove" and "Phil Spector-styled production". Chris DeVille, writing for Stereogum, characterized the song as featuring a "contagiously upbeat drum part", and suggested that its sound was an early predecessor to hip-hop music.

Pilooski remix
In 2007, French disc jockey Pilooski re-edited and released his version of the Four Seasons song. This version reached number 32 in the United Kingdom and number one on the UK Dance Chart. It is the first single from the album Beggin': The Ultimate Collection. The Pilooski re-edit does not include any new instrumentation or vocals but is purely a manipulation and remix of the original Four Seasons recording, using echo and phase-polarisation.

Certifications

Madcon version

In 2007, the same year as the Pilooski remix, Norwegian hip-hop duo Madcon released a new version of the song with tweaked lyrics and added rap verses. Madcon's version of the song is a total re-recording, with all instruments were performed by production team 3Elementz (Hitesh Ceon, Kim Ofstad, Jonny Sjo) and all vocals by Madcon. This version reached number one on Norway's VG-lista chart for 12 nonconsecutive weeks and received the "Hit of the Year" Spellemannprisen award.

The single also became popular throughout Europe; in France, the Netherlands, and the Wallonia region of Belgium, it peaked at number one. It reached number five in the United Kingdom and number seven in Germany. Overall, "Beggin was Europe's 11th-most-successful single of 2008. The music video features Yosef Wolde-Mariam and Tshawe Baqwa in a mix of Blaxploitation scenes and dozing off while playing Halo 3 and was directed by Christian Holm-Glad.

Following the success of Måneskin's cover in 2021, Madcon's version saw a rise in popularity. As a result, the duo teamed up with Canadian DJ Frank Walker for a remix released on July 16, 2021.

Track listings
French CD single
 "Beggin (original version) – 3:38
 "Beggin (Uscar version) – 3:38

German enhanced maxi-single
 "Beggin (original version) – 3:38
 "Beggin (Phreak Inc. remix) – 4:11
 "Beggin (Demolition Disco remix) – 5:41
 "Beggin (DJ Size Rocfam remix) – 3:09
 "Beggin (video) – 3:41

Digital download
 "Beggin – 3:38

Digital download – Frank Walker remix
 "Beggin (Frank Walker remix) – 3:14

Charts

Weekly charts

Year-end charts

Certifications

Måneskin version

Italian rock band Måneskin performed a cover of the song during the eleventh season of X Factor Italia. A studio version of the song later appeared on their debut extended play Chosen, released in 2017. Recording sessions for the Chosen EP took place at the Metropolis in Milan, and mostly occurred at night, while the band was still competing on the show, and lasted only a few days. They were held at the recording studio owned by Lucio Fabbri, who served as the track's producer. Fabbri described the recording process for "Beggin as the result of a low-budget session. The song was "almost recorded live", in a spontaneous manner which, according to him, helped to preserve the "human component, which disappeared in today's music, often processed and filtered".
Their cover largely follows the structure of the Madcon version, including the rap verse. 
Although it was not released as a single, it peaked at number 39 on the Italian Singles Chart and in 2018 received a gold certification by FIMI in their native country.

Following the band's Eurovision victory in late May 2021, the song alongside the band's other releases started appearing on music charts across Europe and beyond; viral success for the song on video sharing service TikTok soon followed. "Beggin has reached number one on the weekly charts in Austria, the Czech Republic, Germany, Greece, Lithuania, Netherlands, Portugal, Slovakia and Switzerland, the top five in Australia, Finland, France, Hungary, Ireland, Malaysia, New Zealand, Norway and Sweden, and the top ten in Canada, Denmark, India, Philippines, Singapore and the United Kingdom.

On its first charting week on the UK Singles Chart (issue date June 24, 2021), the song debuted at number 73, but in the following The Official Chart: First Look Top 20, it moved 56 places to number 17. In the second charting week it peaked at number 10, becoming the band's third UK Top 20 hit in less than a month, and as their song "I Wanna Be Your Slave" charted again in the Top 10 it was the first time they simultaneously had two songs in the Top 10 of the UK Singles Chart, thus becoming the first Italian act and the first Eurovision-associated act to achieve this. On its third charting week in the UK it peaked at number 7. It debuted on the Billboard Hot 100 at number 78, later peaking at number 13, and has also reached the top five on the Billboard Global 200 and Global Excl. US charts.

Their cover received a nomination for Favorite Trending Song at the American Music Awards of 2021, where they also performed the song, eventually losing to Megan Thee Stallion's "Body". They also performed the song on The Tonight Show Starring Jimmy Fallon, on The Ellen DeGeneres Show, during the January 22, 2022 episode of Saturday Night Live, during the twenty-first season of The Voice USA, and on the final of the fifteenth season of X Factor Italia, returning as guests four years after their first performance there as contestants.

A live recording of the song was released as a digital single on September 27, 2021.

Charts

Weekly charts

Year-end charts

Certifications

Other cover versions
The Four Seasons' original version did not chart in the United Kingdom.  Instead, psychedelic pop band Timebox had a minor hit with their Michael Aldred production of the song, peaking at number 38 in 1968. In 1967 Italian singer Riki Maiocchi performed his cover, "Prega". In the same year, a Spanish version was released under the title "Ruega" by the band "Duo Inter". French singer and composer Claude François sung the French version "Reste" (lit. meaning "Stay") in 1968. In 1974, Dutch band Shocking Blue included a cover version of the song on their album Good Times. In June 2009, Dutch singer-songwriter Bertolf recorded a semi-acoustic  live for the Dutch radio station 3FM. Since then, Bertolf's version has been released commercially on iTunes, played regularly on said radio station and during live concerts.

In 2008, British-Irish girl band the Saturdays, inspired by both Pilooski and Madcon, recorded their own version as a B-side for their single "Issues", a single from their debut studio album Chasing Lights (2008), and performed a live acoustic version on BBC Radio 1's Live Lounge as well as on their The Work Tour in 2009.

Turkish türkü singer Ferhat Güzel parodied the song, dubbed "Begüm (Suçu Kendine At)" - literally "Begüm (Blame Yourself)", for Okan Bayülgen's TV show Disko Kralı. It was sung by Michael Sarver, Megan Joy, Scott MacIntyre, Lil Rounds, Anoop Desai and Matt Giraud at the end of the first half of the American Idol Tour. Turkish band Dolapdere Big Gang covered the song on their 2010 album Art-ist. French singer-guitarist Aymeric Savignat ( "Tidusko") covered the song on the compilation album La Musique de Paris Dernière Vol.7 (2009). In 2012, vocal harmony group District3 performed the song as part of a mash-up with Chris Brown's "Turn Up the Music" on The X Factor UK.

Logic sampled the Song 2007 in the Song "Begging you".

Swedish singer Magnus Carlson, usually the front man of Weeping Willows, has covered the song twice, first in a version with lyrics translated into Swedish ("Jag Ber Dig") in 2003, and later a version with the original lyrics in 2018.

Uses in the media
In 2009, many remixes similar to the Pilooski remix of the original "Beggin were used in adidas' "House Party" commercial featuring many celebrities past and present who were sponsored by the company, which was promoting 60 years of "outfitting the world in three stripes." Celebrities who make an appearance in the commercial include David Beckham, Missy Elliott, Katy Perry, The Ting Tings, Kevin Garnett, Young Jeezy, Russell Simmons, Estelle, Redman, Method Man and Ilie Năstase, among others. One of these remixes was made by aKido and can be found on his soundcloud page.

The song was used as part of the BBC's coverage of the 2009/2010 Formula One Championship, primarily during course run-through. Also in 2009, the Madcon cover of "Beggin was used by HBO as a theme for its summer programming. "Beggin was on the NBA Live 2009 video game soundtrack. The song is also used: in a scene in the film Just Go With It; in part of the Bad Teacher trailer; as the song for the 24th Street part in the Tilt Mode Army skateboarding video; in the film Step Up 3D; and in the film Macaframa. The Madcon version of "Beggin was sung by the winning contestant from American Idol (season 11), Phillip Phillips in the final three performance night. Logic used it as a sample in his Young Sinatra mixtape.
Matthew Fisher has stated that he got the idea for the chord sequence for his composition "Repent Walpurgis" on Procol Harum's first album from the Four Seasons' "Beggin.

The song saw a resurgence in 2021 on TikTok thanks to Måneskin's cover, when it was first uploaded as a sound by user tvdposts. Its rise in popularity was particularly boosted through its usage by user Charli D'Amelio.

The original version by the Four Seasons was used in the episode "Dangling Man" in the third season of the Netflix series The Crown.

See also
 List of UK Dance Singles Chart number ones of 2007
 List of number-one hits in Norway
 List of number-one hits of 2008 (France)
 List of Ultratop 40 number-one singles of 2008
 List of Dutch Top 40 number-one singles of 2009
 List of top 10 singles for 2021 in Australia
 List of number-one hits of 2021 (Austria)
 List of number-one hits of 2021 (Germany)
 List of top 10 singles in 2021 (Ireland)
 List of number-one hits of 2021 (Switzerland)
 List of UK top-ten singles in 2021

References

1967 songs
1967 singles
2007 singles
2008 singles
Bonnier Music singles
Columbia Records singles
Dutch Top 40 number-one singles
The Four Seasons (band) songs
Madcon songs
Måneskin songs
Northern soul songs
Number-one singles in Austria
Number-one singles in Germany
Number-one singles in Greece
Number-one singles in the Netherlands
Number-one singles in Norway
Number-one singles in Portugal
Number-one singles in Switzerland
Philips Records singles
RCA Records singles
The Saturdays songs
SNEP Top Singles number-one singles
Song recordings produced by Bob Crewe
Songs written by Bob Gaudio
Sony BMG singles
Sony Music singles
Ultratop 50 Singles (Wallonia) number-one singles
Viral videos